Vemuluripadu is a village in Phirangipuram mandal, Guntur district of Andhra Pradesh, India.

Villages in Guntur district